George William Vella  (born 24 April 1942) is a Maltese politician who has served as president of Malta since 2019. A member of the Labour Party, he previously served as deputy prime minister of Malta and foreign affairs minister from 1996 to 1998 under prime minister Alfred Sant. In 2013, he returned as foreign affairs minister, an office he held until 2017 under prime minister Joseph Muscat.

Early life and family 
Vella was born in Żejtun on 24 April 1942, where he finished his primary education. Vella graduated from the Faculty of Medicine and Surgery in the Royal University of Malta in 1964 and became a qualified medical doctor. He obtained a certificate in Aviation Medicine from Farnborough, UK and he has been a specialist in family medicine since 2003. Between 1964 and 1966, Vella worked as a houseman in St. Luke's Hospital and soon after he applied and worked between 1966 and 1973 as a medical officer for Malta's drydocks. After that, he served as the medical officer to Air Malta and as a consultant in Aviation Medicine.

He is married to Miriam and they together have two daughters and a son, along with seven grandchildren.

Career

Labour Party 
Vella joined the Labour Party and started his parliamentary career in 1976. He was then elected member of parliament in January 1978, and during the 1981, 1992, 1996, 1998, 2003, 2008 and 2013 general elections. As a member of Parliament, he represents the 3rd and 5th Districts.

In 1978, Vella was a substitute member of the Parliamentary Assembly of the Council of Europe and rapporteur on maritime pollution from maritime sources at the Conference of Local and Regional Authorities of Europe (CLRAE). From January to May 1987, he served as Malta's permanent representative at the Council of Europe.

In 1992, Vella was elected as the Labour Party deputy leader for parliamentary affairs and spokesperson on foreign affairs and served that role until 2003. He served as vice-chairman on the Joint EU/Malta Parliamentary Committee. From 1995 to 1996, Vella was a member of the House Business Committee and the Foreign Affairs Parliamentary Committee.

Deputy Prime Minister and Minister of Foreign Affairs 

He was appointed deputy prime minister and minister for foreign affairs and environment in October 1996 and again in March 2013, serving to June 2017.

Vella has voiced his support for the Campaign for the Establishment of a United Nations Parliamentary Assembly, an organisation which campaigns for democratic reformation of the United Nations, and the creation of a more accountable international political system.

President of Malta 
In early 2019, Vella was speculated to become the next president of Malta. Vella was nominated for the position of the president of Malta by the governing Labour Party at the time including the opposition Nationalist Party. The Democratic Party announced their support for Vella's nomination, but would boycott the vote to protest in favour of a constitutional amendment requiring a two-thirds majority to elect the president. The vote in parliament took place on 2 April 2019, with the Members of Parliament voting to approve Vella's appointment as the only nominee. The appointment was followed by Vella's formal swearing-in as president on 4 April 2019, a date on which every previous Maltese President since 1989 was inaugurated.

Honours

National honours 
: 
 Companion of the National Order of Merit (KOM)
 Grand Master and Companion of Honour of the National Order of Merit, Malta, by right as a President of Malta
 Grand Master of the Xirka Ġieħ ir-Repubblika

Foreign honours 
: 
  Grand Commander Order of Honour (Greece)
: 
  Knight Grand Cross of the Order of Saint Agatha (San Marino)
: 
  Honorary Knight Commander of the Order of St Michael and St George (United Kingdom)
: 
  Grand Cross pro merito melitensi of the Order pro Merito Melitensi (Sovereign Military Order of Malta)

See also 
List of foreign ministers in 2017 
List of foreign ministers in 2016

References

External links 

 George William Vella's official page in the Ministry of Foreign Affairs (Malta)

|-

|-

|-

|-

|-

1942 births
Presidents of Malta
Deputy Prime Ministers of Malta
Government ministers of Malta
Labour Party (Malta) politicians
Living people
People from Żejtun
Maltese general practitioners
Members of the House of Representatives of Malta
21st-century Maltese physicians
20th-century Maltese physicians
Recipients of the Order pro Merito Melitensi
Honorary Knights Commander of the Order of St Michael and St George
Foreign ministers of Malta
20th-century Maltese politicians
21st-century Maltese politicians